Oleksandr Vasylovich Kulyk (1957 – 1 March 2022) was a Ukrainian cycling coach and a 1988 Honored Coach of Ukraine. He died in battle on March 1, 2022, during the Russian invasion of Ukraine.
Kulyk was born in 1957 in the village Seredyna-Buda in Sumy Oblast. In 1979, he graduated from the Kyiv State Institute of Physical Education. He is the father of Ukrainian cycling champion Andriy Kulyk.

While he was working in Sumy, he trained Oleksandr Kirichenko, the Olympic champion of the 1988 Seoul Summer Olympics in the 1000-meter free standing as part of the USSR national team, as well as the silver medalist of the 2000 Sydney Olympic Games, Oleksandr Fedenko.

He worked as the director of the children's and youth sports school "Ukraine" of the organization "Sumbud" OJSC.

He died on March 1, 2022, in the battle near Nyzy in Sumy Oblast during the Russian invasion of Ukraine.

References 

1957 births
2022 deaths
Ukrainian male cyclists
Ukrainian sports coaches
People from Sumy Oblast
People killed in the 2022 Russian invasion of Ukraine